Michael F. Robinson (born June 24, 1973 in Richmond, Virginia) is a former professional American football defensive back who played the 1996 season for the Green Bay Packers of the National Football League, winning a Super Bowl ring in the process. Robinson attended college and played college football at Hampton University.

1973 births
Living people
Players of American football from Richmond, Virginia
American football defensive backs
Hampton Pirates football players
Green Bay Packers players